R. Jebamani was an Indian politician and former Member of the Legislative Assembly. He was elected to the Tamil Nadu legislative assembly as a Janata Party candidate from Sathankulam constituency in 1977 election.

References 

Tamil Nadu politicians